In astronomy, a tetrad is a set of four total lunar eclipses within two consecutive years.

List of tetrad events

1949–2000

2001–51

See also 
  for statistics by century
 Blood moon prophecy Apocalyptic preaching of John Hagee and Mark Biltz in part based on the observed phenomenon.

References 

Lunar eclipses